The Cornwall Council election, 2009, was an election for all 123 seats on the council. Cornwall Council is a unitary authority that covers the majority of the ceremonial county of Cornwall, with the exception of the Isles of Scilly which have an independent local authority. The elections took place concurrently with other local elections across England and Wales as well as the UK component of the elections to the European Parliament. Cornwall had seen its district and county councils abolished, replaced by a single 123-member Cornish unitary authority, for which councillors were elected for a full term.

All locally registered electors (British, Irish, Commonwealth and European Union citizens) who were aged 18 or over on Thursday 2 May 2009 were entitled to vote in the local elections. Those who were temporarily away from their ordinary address (for example, away working, on holiday, in student accommodation or in hospital) were also entitled to vote in the local elections, although those who had moved abroad and registered as overseas electors cannot vote in the local elections. It is possible to register to vote at more than one address (such as a university student who had a term-time address and lives at home during holidays) at the discretion of the local Electoral Register Office, but it remains an offence to vote more than once in the same local government election.

Results

Electoral division results
The electoral division results listed below.

References

External links
Election results Cornwall Council website

2009 English local elections
2009
2000s in Cornwall